Heights Tarn is a small lake to the east of Windermere and north of Simpson Ground Reservoir, near Cartmel Fell, in the Lake District of Cumbria, England. Although just off the main road, the lake is not accessible to the public, lying on private land and contains a boathouse on its eastern bank. About 400 metres to the south is Sow How Tarn.

References

Lakes of the Lake District
South Lakeland District